Sydney Green & Sons was a civil engineering contractor from Oxfordshire in England, which built sections of British motorways, notably the M2 in Kent, M5 and the M40, mostly in the Home Counties.

History
It was formed by Colonel Sydney W. Green OBE on 19 February 1948.

The company floated on the London stock exchange in January 1959.

The company was bought on Monday 6 November 1967 for around £2.8m, and operated as a subsidiary.

In 1973, the company made a £904,000 loss, and the parent company withdrew from civil engineering.

Structure
It held annual general meetings in Henley-on-Thames, where it was headquartered.

Construction
 A14 - it was awarded a £2m contract on Tuesday 16 March 1971 for the Trimley bypass of the A45, by East Suffolk County Council
 M2 - the contract was awarded on Monday 12 June 1961 for the 26-mile motorway, where it built part of the £1,106,408 Section 1, as part of a consortium
 M40 - as part of a consortium of two other contractors, it was offered the contract of £4,749,822 on Monday 29 June 1964 for the first eight miles of the A40(M) in Buckinghamshire, now the M40, where work started on 1 July 1964, to last 28 months, and on Tuesday 12 January 1971 it was awarded a £290,274 contract to build the Knaves Beech Interchange junction 3 on the M40 at Loudwater, Buckinghamshire, near the Loudwater Viaduct
 M5 - awarded the contract of £5.5m on Thursday 5 June 1969 for six miles of the motorway from Brookthorpe to Eastington, Stroud in Gloucestershire, to take two years in partnership with Costain Group

References

British companies established in 1948
British companies disestablished in 1973
Companies based in Oxfordshire
Construction and civil engineering companies of England
Construction and civil engineering companies disestablished in the 20th century
Henley-on-Thames